William Estes may refer to:

William Kaye Estes (born 1919), American scientist
William Lee Estes (1870–1930), U.S. federal judge
Will Estes (born 1978), American actor
William R. Estes (born 1852) Minnesota politician